Zeeshan Butt (born 20 February 1978) is a Pakistani first-class cricketer who played for Faisalabad cricket team.

References

External links
 

1978 births
Living people
Pakistani cricketers
Faisalabad cricketers
Cricketers from Faisalabad